The Lawrason Act is an 1898 measure of the Louisiana State Legislature which permits municipalities in the state to incorporate into towns or cities without specific clearance from the legislature.

It is named for the attorney Samuel McCutcheon Lawrason, who was a state senator from St. Francisville, the seat of West Feliciana Parish for two nonconsecutive terms, 1896-1900 and 1920-1924.

The Lawrason Act was used, for instance, on April 4, 1951, in Newellton in Tensas Parish to upgrade the community from a village to a town. 

In 1912, the Lawrason Act established a city commission government for Alexandria. The mayor under that system served as the Commissioner of Public Health and Safety (Police, Fire, Sanitation). There were separate Commissioners of Streets and Parks and Finance and Utilities, all elected citywide. The last to hold those positions, which ended in 1977, were Mayor John K. Snyder, Malcolm Hebert, and Arnold Jack Rosenthal, respectively. The commission form ended with a new mayor-council charter in 1977.

References

1898 in American law
Louisiana law
1898 in Louisiana